The McNeese Cowboys football program is the intercollegiate American football team for McNeese State University located in the U.S. state of Louisiana. The team competes in the NCAA Division I Football Championship Subdivision (FCS) and are members of the Southland Conference. McNeese's first football team was fielded in 1940. The team plays its home games at the 17,410 seat Cowboy Stadium in Lake Charles, Louisiana.

History

On August 31, 2013, McNeese opened their season by defeating the South Florida Bulls, 53–21. It was the largest margin of victory (32 points) by a Football Championship Subdivision (FCS, formerly I-AA) team over a Football Bowl Subdivision (FBS, formerly I-A) team since the NCAA split Division I football into two divisions in 1978.

Championships

Southland Conference champions
 1976, 1979, 1980, 1991, 1993, 1995, 1997, 2001, 2002, 2003, 2006, 2007, 2009, 2015

Division I-AA championship games
 1997, L 9–10 to Youngstown State
 2002, L 14–34 to Western Kentucky

Bowl games
The Cowboys have participated in six bowl games, the first three being College Division bowl games and the last three being against Division I-A teams. They also participated in the Cajun Bowl against the Southern Arkansas Muleriders in 1947, which ended in a scoreless tie.

Rivalries

Central Arkansas

The two teams have met 13 times on the football field with Central Arkansas leading the series 7–6–0.  Due to conference scheduling requirements, the most recent game was played in 2019.

Lamar

The two teams have met 40 times on the football field, with McNeese State holding a 28-11-1 agreement with the two universities and Verizon Wireless.

Louisiana

 
The Cajun Crown was the name of the rivalry trophy between Louisiana and McNeese State.

Northwestern State

McNeese State leads the series with Northwestern State 48–23–1 through the 2021 season.

Notable former players
Notable alumni include:
NFL
Don Breaux - Denver (1963) and San Diego ('64-'65); also coordinated Washington Redskins (1981–1989, 1990–1993, 2004–2007) and various teams
Tom Sestak - AFL Buffalo Bills (1962–1968)
Leonard Smith - St. Louis/Phoenix Cardinals (1983-1988), Buffalo Bills (1988–1991) (College Football Hall of Famer)
Stephen Starring - New England Patriots (1983–1987), Detroit Lions and Tampa Bay Buccaneers (1988)
Buford Jordan - New Orleans/Portland Breakers (1984–1985) USFL, New Orleans Saints (1986–1992)
Kavika Pittman - Dallas Cowboys (1996–99), Denver (2000–2002), Carolina (2003)
Zach Bronson - San Francisco 49ers (1997–2003); St. Louis (2004)
Kerry Joseph - Seattle Seahawks (1999–2002)
Keith Ortego - Chicago Bears (1985–1987)
Flip Johnson - Buffalo Bills (1988–1989)
Bryan Hicks - Cincinnati Bengals (1980–1982)
Jimmy Redmond – various teams (2001–2006)
Luke Lawton - various teams (2005–2010)
B. J. Sams - Baltimore Ravens (2004–2007); Kansas City Chiefs (2008)
B. J. Blunt - Washington Redskins (2019)
Diontae Spencer - St. Louis Rams (2014), Pittsburgh Steelers (2019) Denver Broncos (2019–Present)

CFL
Kerry Joseph - Ottawa Renegades (2003–2005), Saskatchewan Roughriders (2006–2007, 2014), Toronto Argonauts (2008–2009), Edmonton Eskimos (2010–2013)
Diontae Spencer - Toronto Argonauts (2015–2016), Ottawa Redblacks (2017–2018)

Future non-conference opponents 
Announced schedules as of November 28, 2022.

See also
List of NCAA Division I FCS football programs

References

External links
 

 
American football teams established in 1940
1940 establishments in Louisiana